McNaughton or MacNaughton is a surname. Notable people with the surname include:

MacNaughton
 Alan Macnaughton (1903–1999), Canadian parliamentarian and Speaker of the Canadian House of Commons
 Charles MacNaughton, Canadian politician
 Ian MacNaughton (1925–2002), television producer/director associated with Monty Python
 John 'Half Hung MacNaghten', or MacNaughton, Irish figure of 18th-century romantic folklore
 John A. MacNaughton (1945–2013), Canadian businessman
 John H. MacNaughton (1929-2022), American Episcopal bishop
 Lukas MacNaughton, (born 1995), footballer
 Malcolm Macnaughton (disambiguation)
 Malcolm Macnaughton (obstetrician) (1925–2016), Scottish obstetrician, gynaecologist, and academic
 Malcolm Macnaughton (bishop) (born 1957), British Anglican bishop
 Robert MacNaughton (born 1966), American child actor

McNaughton
 Andrew McNaughton (1887–1966), Canadian army officer, politician and diplomat
 Brian McNaughton (1935–2004), American writer
 Bruce McNaughton, Canadian neuroscientist
 Christopher McNaughton (born 1982), German-American basketball player
 Colin McNaughton (born 1951), English writer and illustrator of children's books
 Daniel McNaughton (1851–1925), Canadian politician
 Donald McNaughton (New York politician) (1830–1893), New York politician
 Duncan McNaughton (1910–1998), Canadian Olympic athlete
 Duncan Alexander McNaughton (1877–1962), Canadian politician
 George McNaughton (1897–1991), Canadian professional ice hockey player
 George Matthew McNaughton (1893–1966), British civil engineer
 Gordon McNaughton (1910–1942), American Major League Baseball pitcher
 Gus McNaughton (1881–1969), English film actor
 James McNaughton (disambiguation), several people
 John McNaughton (born 1950), American film director
 John McNaughton (government official) (1921–1967), former United States Assistant Secretary of Defense and advisor to Robert McNamara
 Jon McNaughton, American painter
 Kevin McNaughton (born 1982), Scottish soccer player
 Margaret McNaughton, Canadian writer and historian
 Mark S. McNaughton, American politician from Pennsylvania
 Paul McNaughton (born 1952), Irish rugby union and soccer player
 Robert McNaughton (1924—2014), American computer scientist
 Samuel J. McNaughton (born 1939), American ecologist and Stanford University professor
 Sandy McNaughton (born 1953), Scottish footballer
 Terence McNaughton (born 1964), Irish hurling manager
 William John McNaughton (1926–2020), American Catholic missionary and bishop in South Korea

See also
 Macnaughtan, a surname
 Macnaghten (disambiguation)
 Clan Macnaghten (sometimes spelt as MacNachten or MacNaughton), a Scottish clan
 MacNaughton Cup, a collegiate ice-hockey trophy in the United States
 MacNaughton Mountain, located in Essex County, New York
 Bernice MacNaughton High School, a high school in Moncton, New Brunswick, Canada 
 John Patrick McNaughton Barn, in Ottawa County, Oklahoma
 R. D. McNaughton Building, Moosomin, Saskatchewan, Canada
 McNaughton, Wisconsin, an unincorporated community in the United States
 Daniel M'Naghten, British murderer
 M'Naghten Rules, first serious attempt to codify the insanity defense in criminal cases
 Lady Macnaghten (various spellings), ship taking settlers from Britain to Australia